Darrius Ramar Heyward-Bey (born February 26, 1987) is a former American football wide receiver. He played college football at the University of Maryland, and was drafted by the Oakland Raiders seventh overall in the 2009 NFL Draft. He has also played for the Indianapolis Colts and Pittsburgh Steelers.

Early years
Heyward-Bey attended the McDonogh School in Owings Mills, Maryland, where he played football as a wide receiver and linebacker. During his senior year, he earned first-team all-state honors and was named a PrepStar All-American.

In track and field, Heyward-Bey finished fifth at nationals as a junior and was the Maryland Interscholastic Athletic Association (MIAA) champion in the 100 meters, with a time of 10.44 seconds and in the 200 meters, with a time of 22.44 seconds. He also ran a 60 meters indoor time of 6.83 seconds his junior year and 6.82 seconds his senior year, that joint 6th and joint 4th fastest times in the nation respectively. He also posted a personal best of 6.38 seconds in the 55 meters. He ran career-bests times of 10.3 seconds in the 100 meters and 21.10 seconds in the 200 meters at the 2005 IAAM Championships.

College career

Heyward-Bey was recruited by Alabama, Boston College, Michigan State, Pittsburgh, and Virginia, before ultimately choosing to attend Maryland to play under head coach Ralph Friedgen.

He spent 2005 on redshirt status. In 2006, he ran a 4.23-second 40-yard dash, which set the school record for a wide receiver. That season, he was considered one of the top rookies in the Atlantic Coast Conference (ACC) and earned first-team freshman All-America from the Sporting News and Rivals.com. He led the Terrapins with 45 receptions, and set a school record for a freshman with 694 receiving yards.

In 2007, Heyward-Bey was placed on the Biletnikoff Award watchlist. He led Maryland in receptions, with 51, and receiving yards, with 786. His 63-yard touchdown reception in the 2007 Emerald Bowl against Oregon State stands as the second-longest in Maryland bowl history. At season's end, Heyward-Bey was awarded the team's Most Valuable Offensive Player honor.

During his junior season in 2008, he made 42 catches for 609 yards and five touchdowns, and earned an All-ACC honorable mention. On January 7, 2009, Heyward-Bey announced that he would forgo his senior season to enter the NFL Draft. He finished his career at Maryland second in school history in career receiving yards with 2,089, third in receptions with 138 and tied for third in touchdown catches with 13. In just three years, he was second only to Jermaine Lewis in receiving yards.

College statistics

Professional career

Oakland Raiders
In the 2009 NFL Draft, Heyward-Bey was selected by the Oakland Raiders as the seventh overall pick. As the first wide receiver selected, he was picked earlier than most projections, and before Michael Crabtree and Jeremy Maclin, who most analysts thought would precede Heyward-Bey. At the 2009 NFL Combine, he recorded a 40-yard dash time of 4.30 seconds.

2009
During organized team activities following the draft, Heyward-Bey practiced early but was plagued by multiple hamstring injuries. On July 30, 2009, the Oakland Raiders agreed to terms on a five-year deal with Heyward-Bey worth $23.5 million. As a rookie, Heyward-Bey started 11 games, catching 9 passes for 124 yards and 1 touchdown while also rushing twice for 19 yards. He averaged 11.3 yards per reception in 2009.

2010

In 2010, Heyward-Bey started 14 of the 15 games in which he played. He had 26 receptions for 366 yards and 1 touchdown. On September 19 against the St. Louis Rams, Heyward-Bey had a career-high six receptions. Vittorio Tafur of the San Francisco Chronicle highlighted Heyward-Bey's performance in the game as a marked improvement from the preseason. On October 31, in a 33-3 victory over the Seattle Seahawks, Heyward-Bey made a career-long 69-yard touchdown reception from Jason Campbell, part of a career-high of 105 receiving yards.

2011
On October 2, 2011, in the Raiders' 31-19 loss to the New England Patriots, Heyward-Bey had 4 receptions for 115 yards, including a 58-yard reception. Over the next 3 games, he would compile receiving totals of 99 (October 9 against the Houston Texans), 82 (October 16 against the Cleveland Browns), and 89 (October 23 against the Kansas City Chiefs) yards. On December 18, 2011, in a 28-27 loss to the Detroit Lions, Heyward-Bey had 8 receptions for 155 yards, both new career-highs, and the most single-game receiving yards for the Raiders since Jerry Rice in 2003. On December 24, the Raiders beat the Kansas City Chiefs 16-13 in overtime after Heyward-Bey caught a 53-yard pass from Carson Palmer during overtime to set up Sebastian Janikowski's winning field goal. Heyward-Bey had a total of 4 receptions for 70 yards in the game. On January 1, during a loss to the San Diego Chargers, Heyward-Bey caught 9 passes for 130 yards and a touchdown.

2012
On September 23, 2012, in the fourth quarter of a game against the Pittsburgh Steelers, Heyward-Bey was left unconscious after a hit in the endzone by the Steelers' Ryan Mundy. Heyward-Bey was motionless in the endzone for more than 10 minutes before being placed in an ambulance to the Eden Medical Center in Castro Valley. Heyward-Bey was released from the hospital the next day. Mundy would be later fined for the hit. Overall, in the 2012 season, he had 41 receptions for 606 receiving yards and five receiving touchdowns.

Heyward-Bey was released by the Raiders on March 13, 2013.

Indianapolis Colts

2013
Heyward-Bey signed a one-year deal worth up to $3 million with the Indianapolis Colts on April 1, 2013. Heyward-Bey finished the 2013 season with 29 receptions for 309 yards and a touchdown.

Pittsburgh Steelers

2014
On April 2, 2014, Heyward-Bey signed a one-year contract with the Pittsburgh Steelers.

He entered his first training camp with the Steelers competing with Lance Moore, Derek Moye, Martavis Bryant, and Justin Brown for the third wide receiver position. He was named the fifth receiver on the depth chart to begin the regular season.

As the fifth receiver, he appeared in all 16 games but caught only 3 passes for 33 yards and played predominantly on special teams.

Against the Ravens in the Steelers' playoff loss to the Baltimore Ravens, Heyward-Bey made 1 reception for 6 yards, marking the first postseason catch of his career.

2015
The Steelers re-signed Heyward-Bey to a one-year contract on March 26, 2015.

Following the release of Lance Moore on March 2 and the four-game suspension of Martavis Bryant on August 31, Heyward-Bey became the Steelers' third receiver behind Antonio Brown and Markus Wheaton to begin the 2015 season.

In the opener against the New England Patriots, Heyward-Bey caught 4 passes for 58 yards, including a reception of 43 yards. The following week against the San Francisco 49ers, Heyward-Bey again caught 4 passes, this time for 77 yards and 1 touchdown, marking his highest receiving yardage total since December 6, 2012. In Week 3 against the St. Louis Rams, Heyward-Bey caught 3 passes for 19 yards. In Week 4 against the Baltimore Ravens, he caught 4 passes for 31 yards and 1 touchdown.

In total, Heyward-Bey finished the first quarter of the season with 15 receptions for 185 yards and 2 touchdowns, his best 4-game stretch since 2012, when he caught 15 passes for 257 yards and 2 touchdowns in Weeks 8-11. Martavis Bryant sustained an injury during his first week of practice back with the team following his suspension, leading to Heyward-Bey again filling in as the third receiver for Week 5 against the San Diego Chargers. Against the Chargers, Heyward-Bey made 2 catches for 24 yards, both of which came on the Steelers' game-winning drive.

Heyward-Bey finished the 2015 regular season with 21 receptions for 314 yards and 2 touchdowns. He was held without a catch in the Steelers' first playoff game against the Cincinnati Bengals, but the following week,  against the Denver Broncos, he made 2 receptions for 64 yards.

2016
On March 8, 2016, the Steelers re-signed Heyward-Bey on a three-year, $3.8 million contract.

He entered training camp competing to be the second or third wide receiver on the Steelers' depth chart, with Martavis Bryant suspended for the entire 2016 season. Heyward-Bey was named the fourth receiver behind Antonio Brown, Markus Wheaton, and Sammie Coates.

Through the first eight games of the 2016 season, Heyward-Bey caught 5 passes for 68 yards and 2 touchdowns. Against the Miami Dolphins in Week 6, he carried the ball on a reverse for a 60-yard touchdown for both his longest career rushing attempt and first career rushing touchdown.

However, in Week 9 against the Baltimore Ravens, he sustained a foot and ankle injury which sidelined him for the next six games. He returned for the Steelers' Week 16 rematch against the Ravens, though he did not make any receptions. In Week 17 against the Cleveland Browns, Heyward-Bey caught 1 pass for 46 yards for his longest reception of the season. This brought his 2016 regular season total to 6 receptions for 114 yards and 2 touchdowns.

In the Steelers' opening round playoff game against the Miami Dolphins, Heyward-Bey caught 1 pass for 10 yards, his only reception during the 2016 playoffs.

2017
Heyward-Bey entered training camp in  facing stiff competition for the backup wide receiver position from JuJu Smith-Schuster, Cobi Hamilton, Eli Rogers, Sammie Coates, and Justin Hunter. He was initially named the fourth wide receiver behind Antonio Brown, Martavis Bryant, and Rogers, but was passed on the depth chart by Smith-Schuster early in the season.

Heyward-Bey got his first touch of the season on offense in Week 4 against the Baltimore Ravens, carrying the ball on a reverse for 3 yards. He earned his first passing target and reception in Week 7 against the Cincinnati Bengals on a fake punt when he and teammate Robert Golden connected for 44 yards.

In Week 17 against the Browns, Heyward-Bey scored a 29-yard rushing touchdown on a reverse.

He finished the 2017 season with 2 receptions for 47 yards.

2018
Heyward-Bey appeared in 14 games for the Steelers in 2018, making 2 starts. He finished the season with 1 reception for 9 yards and 1 carry for -7 yards. The Steelers elected not to re-sign Heyward-Bey following the 2018 season.

He finished his Steelers career with 72 regular season games played, starting in 7 of those games, and making 33 receptions for 517 yards and 4 touchdowns. He also carried on 4 rushing attempts for 85 yards and 2 touchdowns. In addition, he appeared in 7 playoff games for the Steelers, starting in 2 of those games and making 4 receptions for 80 yards.

References

External links

Pittsburgh Steelers bio
Indianapolis Colts bio
Oakland Raiders bio
Maryland Terrapins bio

1987 births
Living people
African-American players of American football
American football wide receivers
Indianapolis Colts players
Maryland Terrapins football players
Oakland Raiders players
People from Owings Mills, Maryland
People from Silver Spring, Maryland
Pittsburgh Steelers players
Players of American football from Maryland
Sportspeople from Baltimore County, Maryland
Sportspeople from Montgomery County, Maryland
21st-century African-American sportspeople
20th-century African-American people